Friederike Koderitsch (18 May 1894 – 3 March 1978) was a Dutch fencer. She competed in the women's individual foil event at the 1928 Summer Olympics.

References

External links
 

1894 births
1978 deaths
Dutch female foil fencers
Olympic fencers of the Netherlands
Fencers at the 1928 Summer Olympics
Sportspeople from The Hague